The 2017 International Tennis Federation (ITF) Women's Circuit is a second-tier tour for women's professional tennis. It is organized by the International Tennis Federation and is a tier below the Women's Tennis Association (WTA) Tour. The ITF Women's Circuit includes tournaments with prize money ranging from $15,000 to $100,000.

Schedule

January–March

April–June

July–September

October–December

Participating host nations

Tournament breakdown by event category

Ranking points distribution 

 "+H" indicates that hospitality is provided.

Retired players

Statistics

These tables present the number of singles (S) and doubles (D) titles won by each player and each nation during the season. The players/nations are sorted by: 1) total number of titles (a doubles title won by two players representing the same nation counts as only one win for the nation); 2) a singles > doubles hierarchy; 3) alphabetical order (by family names for players).

To avoid confusion and double counting, these tables should be updated only after an event is completed.

Key

Titles won by player

Titles won by nation

 Alena Fomina started representing Russia in October, she won one title while representing Ukraine.

See also 
 2017 WTA Tour
 2017 WTA 125K series
 2017 ATP World Tour
 2017 ATP Challenger Tour
 2017 ITF Men's Circuit

References

External links 
 International Tennis Federation (ITF)

 
2017
2017 in women's tennis